Strange Geometry is the third studio album by English indie pop band The Clientele. The album was released on 30 August 2005 by Merge Records and on 5 September 2005 by Pointy Records. It was recorded in Walthamstow, London, and received generally positive reviews upon release.

The album's first single was "Since K Got Over Me", which was released on 22 August 2005 in limited quantities on 7" vinyl, backed with "Devil Got My Woman" and "I Believe It". The song "(I Can't Seem To) Make You Mine" originally appeared on a split single with The Relict in 2001, featuring additional vocals by Pam Berry.

The album cover features the 1963 painting The Viaduct by Paul Delvaux.

Track listing

Personnel
Credits for Strange Geometry adapted from album liner notes.

The Clientele
 Alasdair MacLean – vocals, guitar, bouzouki, Rhodes piano, bells
 James Hornsey – bass, piano, Hammond organ, percussion
 Mark Keen – drums, vocals, piano, Hammond organ, percussion

Additional musicians
 Nikki Gleed – violin (1st)
 Sarah Squires – violin (2nd)
 Hannah Stewart – cello
 Charlie Stock – viola

Production
 Brian O'Shaughnessy – production

References

External links
 

2005 albums
The Clientele albums
Merge Records albums